Karma Shedrup Tshering born on 9th April 1990 is a Bhutanese international footballer who plays for Thimphu City. He made his first appearance for the Bhutan national football team in 2011. He also works as a pilot for the national carrier Druk Air.

International career

International goals
Scores and results list Bhutan's goal tally first.

References

Bhutanese footballers
Bhutan international footballers
Living people
1990 births
People from Thimphu
Association football midfielders
Bhutanese aviators